Eugène-Charles-Joseph Silvain (17 June 1851 - 21 August 1930) was a French stage actor, pensionnaire of the Comédie française, sociétaire then dean of the compagny from 1878 to 1928.

Biography 

He left the army to devote himself to opera. He made his debut in Algeria, then played Beaumarchais in Paris. He was received at the Conservatoire d'art dramatique, and later admitted at the Comédie-Française where he was very successful.

In 1883, he became sociétaire of the Comédie-Française. Silvain only had one film acting role, two years before his death, but his appearance as Pierre Cauchon in Carl Theodor Dreyer's classic The Passion of Joan of Arc earned him a small spot in film history.

He married , a tragedian with a brilliant career at the théâtre de l'Odéon, then at the Comédie-Française.

He was cremated and his ashes are located at the Père Lachaise Cemetery (case 4454 of the columbarium).

Theatre 
 1876 : L'Ombre de Déjazet by Paul Delair (28 October), Troisième Théâtre-Français
 1877 : L'Amour et l'Argent d'Ernest de Calonne, Troisième Théâtre-Français

Comédie-Française 
 Admission in 1878
 Named 310th sociétaire in 1883 
 Dean from 1916 to 1928
 Leave in 1928

 1879 : The School for Husbands by Molière: Ergaste 
 1889 : L'École des maris by Molière: Ergaste 
 1891 : Griselidis by Armand Silvestre and Eugène Morand: le marquis de Saluces 
 1894 : Severo Torelli by François Coppée 
 1897 : Tristan de Léonois by Armand Silvestre 
 1901 : L'Énigme by Paul Hervieu 
 1901 : Les Burgraves by Victor Hugo 
 1902 : L'École des maris by Molière : Ergaste 
 1904 : Le Père Lebonnard by Jean Aicard : Lebonnard 
 1906 : Hernani by Victor Hugo 
 1907 : Polyeucte by Corneille 
 1907 : Electra by Sophocles
 1909 : La Robe rouge by Eugène Brieux 
 1915 : Le Mariage forcé by Molière 
 1920 : La Fille de Roland by Henri de Bornier 
 1920 : Hernani by Victor Hugo 
 1920 : The Death of Pompey by Corneille
 1922 : Dom Juan by Molière 
 1922 : Marion Delorme by Victor Hugo
 1923 : Electra by Sophocles

Filmography 
 1922 : Molière, sa vie, son œuvre (documentary film)
 1928 : The Passion of Joan of Arc: Bishop Pierre Cauchon

External links 

 

French male stage actors
Sociétaires of the Comédie-Française
19th-century French male actors
20th-century French male actors
People from Bourg-en-Bresse
1851 births
1930 deaths
Burials at Père Lachaise Cemetery